This is a list of parliaments of England from the reign of King Henry III, when the Curia Regis developed into a body known as Parliament, until the creation of the Parliament of Great Britain in 1707.

For later parliaments, see the List of parliaments of Great Britain. For the history of the English Parliament, see Parliament of England.

The parliaments of England were traditionally referred to by the number counting forward from the start of the reign of a particular monarch, unless the parliament was notable enough to come to be known by a particular title, such as the Good Parliament or the Parliament of Merton.

Parliaments of Henry III

Parliaments of Edward I

Parliaments of Edward II

Parliaments of Edward III

Parliaments of Richard II

Parliaments of Henry IV

Parliaments of Henry V

Parliaments of Henry VI

Parliaments of Edward IV

Parliament of Richard III

Parliaments of Henry VII

Parliaments of Henry VIII

Parliaments of Edward VI

Parliaments of Mary I

Parliaments of Elizabeth I

Parliaments of James I

Parliaments of Charles I
The Long Parliament, which commenced in this reign, had the longest term and the most complex history of any English Parliament. The entry in the first table below relates to the whole Parliament. Although it rebelled against King Charles I and continued to exist long after the King's death, it was a Parliament he originally summoned. An attempt has been made to set out the different phases of the Parliament in the second table in this section and in subsequent sections. The phases are explained in a note.

The Long Parliament (Royalist phases)

Parliaments of the Revolution and Commonwealth

Parliaments of the Protectorate

These parliaments included representatives of Scotland and Ireland.

Parliaments of the Commonwealth

Parliaments of Charles II

Parliament of James II

Parliaments of William III and Mary II

 Note: The Convention Parliament of 1689 is usually referred to as the 1st Parliament of William & Mary and thus the 1690 parliament is referred to as the "Second Parliament". The very first act of the 1690 parliament (2 Will. & Mar., c.1) was to legitimise the Convention parliament as a lawfully-summoned parliament.
 Note: Queen Mary II died in December 1694, during the sixth session of the second parliament. Subsequent parliamentary sessions are labelled as "William III" alone (rather than "William & Mary"), but their numbering is not reset. The next parliament (1695) is conventionally called the "third parliament", the 1698 parliament the "fourth parliament" etc.

Parliaments of Anne

On 29 April 1707, the Parliament of Great Britain was constituted. The members of the 2nd Parliament of Queen Anne became part of the 1st Parliament of Great Britain.

See also
 Duration of English parliaments before 1660
 Duration of English, British and United Kingdom parliaments from 1660
 Lists of MPs elected to the English parliament
 List of MPs elected to the English parliament in 1593
 List of MPs elected to the English parliament in 1597
 List of MPs elected to the English parliament in 1601
 List of MPs elected to the English parliament in 1604
 List of MPs elected to the English parliament in 1614
 List of MPs elected to the English parliament in 1621
 List of MPs elected to the English parliament in 1624
 List of MPs elected to the English parliament in 1625
 List of MPs elected to the English parliament in 1626
 List of MPs elected to the English parliament in 1628
 List of MPs elected to the English parliament in April 1640
 List of MPs elected to the English parliament in November 1640
 List of MPs elected to the English parliament in 1654
 List of MPs elected to the English parliament in 1656
 List of MPs elected to the English parliament in 1659
 List of MPs elected to the English Parliament in 1660
 List of MPs elected to the English Parliament in 1661
 List of MPs elected to the English Parliament in 1705
 List of British governments
 List of parliaments of Great Britain
 List of parliaments of the United Kingdom
 Regnal years of English monarchs

References

Sources

 
 
 
 
 
 
 
  (available online from )

Further reading
 
 

 
 
Parliaments of England
Political history of England
Parliaments